Heather Halley (born September 28, 1969) is an American film, television, stage and voice actress. She is perhaps best known as the English voice of Para-Medic in the Metal Gear series and was an announcer for several awards ceremonies, including the 59th Grammy Awards, the 4th and 5th Spike Video Game Awards, and the 10th Nickelodeon Kids' Choice Awards. Halley has also worked on voice work, including the web series Terminator Salvation: The Machinima Series.

Voice acting career

Anime
 Honey and Clover - Kaoru Morita, Hagumi Hanamoto
 Honey and Clover II - Hagumi Hanamoto

Web series
 Terminator Salvation: The Machinima Series – Various voices

Video games
 Betty Boop Dance Card - Betty Boop
 Dead Rising 3 - Kyla, additional voices
 EverQuest II - Additional voices
 Final Fantasy XIV - Various
 Fire Emblem Heroes - Mirabilis
 Metal Gear Solid 3: Snake Eater, Metal Gear Solid 3: Subsistence, Metal Gear Solid: Portable Ops - Para-Medic 
 Rogue Galaxy - Angela Seas, Miyoko
 Shadow of Rome - Iris, additional voices
 Soulcalibur IV, Soulcalibur: Broken Destiny, Soulcalibur VI - Cassandra Alexandra
 Tales of Legendia - Chloe Valens (uncredited) 
 The 3rd Birthday - Additional voices

References

External links 

 
 

1969 births
20th-century American actresses
21st-century American actresses
American video game actresses
American stage actresses
American television actresses
American television news anchors
Living people
Place of birth missing (living people)
American women television journalists